BBC Radio 1 Live in Concert is the 1991 album released by Caravan. It was recorded live on 21 March 1975 at the Paris Theatre, London.

Track listing 
"Love in Your Eye" (Richard Coughlan, Pye Hastings, Richard Sinclair) – 15:30
"For Richard" (Coughlan, Hastings, Dave Sinclair, Sinclair) – 16:55
"The Dab Song Concerto" (Sinclair) – 18:45
"Hoedown" (Hastings) – 5:20

Personnel 
Caravan
 Pye Hastings – guitar, vocals
 Geoff Richardson – violin, guitar
 David Sinclair – keyboards
 Mike Wedgwood – bass guitar
 Richard Coughlan – drums

Releases information 
 CD Windsong International WINCD 003

References

External links 
 Caravan - BBC Radio 1 Live in Concert album review by Bruce Eder, credits & releases at AllMusic.com
 Caravan - BBC Radio 1 Live in Concert album releases & credits at Discogs.com
 Caravan - BBC Radio 1 Live in Concert album credits & user reviews at ProgArchives.com

Caravan (band) live albums
1991 live albums
BBC Radio recordings